Kentucky Route 95 (KY 95) is a  state highway in Marshall County, Kentucky. It runs from U.S. Route 68 south of Calvert City to Haddox Ferry Road in northern Calvert City via Calvert City.

Route description
The highway runs from a junction with US 68 just northwest of Draffenville, and crosses Interstate 24 via an overpass before intersection US Route 62. At Calvert City, KY 95 intersects KY 282 and KY 1523. It terminates just north of the KY 1523 junction.

History 
KY 95 was originally designated from the Tennessee state line at Hazel, Kentucky, through the Calloway County seat of Murray, through Benton and Draffenville, along with its current routing. KY 95 also previously traversed the Tennessee River into Livingston County via a Free Ferry to meet an intersection with the original routing of US 62 (in that area, it is now KY 453). KY 95 from the Tennessee state line to Draffenville was eventually replaced by U.S. Route 641 during the 1950s, thus shortening KY 95 dramatically. As for the ferry on the Tennessee River, service was discontinued in the mid 1960s.

Major intersections

References

Transportation in Marshall County, Kentucky
0095